John James Ingalls  is a 1905 marble sculpture of the politician of the same name by Charles Henry Niehaus, installed in the United States Capitol, in Washington D.C., as part of the National Statuary Hall Collection. It was one of two statues donated by the state of Kansas. The statue was accepted in the collection by Senator Arthur P. Gorman on January 21, 1905. On July 27, 2022, it was replaced by a Statue of Amelia Earhart.

See also
 1905 in art

References

External links
 

1905 establishments in Washington, D.C.
1905 sculptures